The Aréthuse class were submarines built for the French Navy in the 1950s. They were designed as attack submarines for anti-submarine warfare and were referred to as Sous-marins de Chasse by the French Navy. These submarines had advanced sensors and were very quiet. They were influenced by the World War II German Type XXIII U-boats. The  are an enlarged version built for the French, Pakistani, Portuguese, Spanish and South African navies.

Description
Designated Sous-marins de Chasse  by the French Navy the Aréthuse class were designed as attack submarines specifically for operations in the Mediterranean Sea. The design was influenced by the German World War II Type XXIII U-boats, though were larger, with a heavier armament and faster when submerged but retained a small silhouette and great manoeverability. The Aréthuse class were the first French submarines to use a diesel-electric propulsion system and were powered by two 12-cylinder SEMT Pielstick diesel engines driving one shaft rated at  surfaced. The generators were placed on spring suspensions and the motor was attached directly to the shaft creating a near-silent operational environment while submerged. The submarines had a maximum speed of  surfaced and  submerged.

Aréthuse-class submarines were armed with four torpedo tubes in the bow for four  torpedoes. The submarines carried four reloads. They were designed primarily for ant-submarine warfare. They were equipped with DUUA I sonar. The Aréthuse-class submarines had a complement of 40 including 6 officers. By 1981, their sonar had been upgraded to one active DUUA II sonar, one passive DUUA II sonar, one passive ranging DUUX 2 sonar.

Ships

Service history
Two submarines, Aréthuse and Argonaute, were ordered as part of the 1953 construction programme, and the last two, Amazone and Ariane, were ordered as part of the 1954 programme. All four submarines were constructed at the Arsenal de Cherbourg in Cherbourg, France. The first two were laid down in March 1955, and the last two in December. By 1960 all four submarines had entered service and operated exclusively in the Mediterranean Sea as a deterrent against threats to commercial shipping between France and its colonies in North Africa. On 14 March 1979, Aréthuse was taken out of service and placed in reserve. Amazone followed in June 1980 and Ariane in March 1981. Argonaute was taken out of service in 1982. Argonaute was transferred to Paris to become a museum exhibit in 1989. The design of the French  was based on the Aréthuse class.

Citations

References
 
 
 
 
 

Submarine classes
 
Ship classes of the French Navy